Nektaria Panagi (born 20 March 1990 in Larnaca) is a Cypriot long jumper. Her personal best is 6.72m, achieved in Argos Orestiko, Greece on July 7, 2018. She is known for winning the gold medal at the 2013 Mediterranean Games, the silver medal at the 2017 Summer Universiade, the qualification at the 2018 European Championships final, as well as the participation at the 2017 World Championships and 2019 World Championships .

Achievements

References

External links
 

1990 births
Cypriot female long jumpers
Living people
People from Larnaca
Athletes (track and field) at the 2014 Commonwealth Games
Athletes (track and field) at the 2018 Commonwealth Games
Female long jumpers
Commonwealth Games competitors for Cyprus
Mediterranean Games gold medalists for Cyprus
Athletes (track and field) at the 2009 Mediterranean Games
Athletes (track and field) at the 2013 Mediterranean Games
Athletes (track and field) at the 2018 Mediterranean Games
World Athletics Championships athletes for Cyprus
Universiade medalists in athletics (track and field)
Mediterranean Games medalists in athletics
Universiade silver medalists for Cyprus
Competitors at the 2015 Summer Universiade
Medalists at the 2017 Summer Universiade
European Games competitors for Cyprus
Athletes (track and field) at the 2019 European Games
21st-century Cypriot women